The 1998 NFL draft was the procedure by which National Football League teams selected amateur college football players. It is officially known as the NFL Annual Player Selection Meeting. The draft was held April 18–19, 1998, at the Theater at Madison Square Garden in New York City. The league also held a supplemental draft after the regular draft and before the regular season.

Before the draft, there was much debate in the media on if the Indianapolis Colts would select Peyton Manning or Ryan Leaf with the first overall pick. Both were considered excellent prospects and future franchise quarterbacks: Leaf was considered to have more upside and a stronger throwing arm, whereas Manning was considered a polished prospect who was NFL ready and more mature. 

On the day of the draft, the Colts selected Manning due to Leaf's disdain for Indianapolis, with Leaf being selected second overall by the San Diego Chargers. Manning went on to be a five-time Most Valuable Player Award winner (the most of any player in NFL history) and was a two-time Super Bowl champion (in 2006 with the Colts and in 2015 with the Denver Broncos), being inducted into the Pro Football Hall Of Fame in 2021, while Leaf was out of the NFL by 2002 and is considered one of the biggest draft busts in NFL history.

Player selections

Supplemental draft
A supplemental draft was held in the summer of 1998. For each player selected in the supplemental draft, the team forfeits its pick in that round in the draft of the following season. The Green Bay Packers and San Diego Chargers both selected players in the 2nd round.

Notable undrafted players

Hall of Famers
 Randy Moss, wide receiver from Marshall, taken 1st round 21st overall by the Minnesota Vikings.
Inducted: Professional Football Hall of Fame Class of 2018.

 Peyton Manning, quarterback from Tennessee, taken 1st round 1st overall by the Indianapolis Colts.
Inducted: Professional Football Hall of Fame Class of 2021.

 Charles Woodson, cornerback from Michigan, taken 1st round 4th overall by the Oakland Raiders.
Inducted: Professional Football Hall of Fame Class of 2021.

 Alan Faneca, guard from LSU, taken 1st round 26th overall by the Pittsburgh Steelers.
Inducted: Professional Football Hall of Fame Class of 2021.

Trades
In the explanations below, (D) denotes trades that took place during the 1994 Draft, while (PD) indicates trades completed pre-draft.

Round one

Round two

Round three

Round four

Round five

Round six

Round seven

Notes

References

External links
 1998 NFL draft

National Football League Draft
NFL Draft
Draft
NFL draft
Madison Square Garden
NFL Draft
American football in New York City
1990s in Manhattan
Sporting events in New York City